State Route 271 (SR 271) is a state highway in the U.S. state of California that runs along a former routing of U.S. Route 101 (US 101) in Mendocino and Humboldt counties. It also connects with State Route 1 just before that route's terminus with US 101 in Leggett. After US 101 was realigned, SR 271 was reduced to being a frontage road in discontinuous segments. While US 101 stays mostly in second growth redwoods, SR 271 is used as a scenic alternate through several old growth redwood groves.

Route description

The southern portion of SR 271 begins at an interchange with US 101 in the community of Cummings. SR 271 winds through the forest, paralleling US 101 and intersecting it twice on its northwest journey. The highway eventually comes into the southern area of Leggett, where SR 271 comes to another grade-separated interchange with US 101. The road continues north, paralleling US 101 to the west, and passing through the Drive-Thru Tree Park. The southern segment of SR 271 terminates at SR 1 in Leggett.

The northern portion of SR 271 begins at another interchange with US 101 and parallels US 101 to the east. At an interchange, it passes to the west of US 101 and continues north to the community of Cooks Valley, where it terminates at an interchange with US 101.

SR 271 is not part of the National Highway System, a network of highways that are considered essential to the country's economy, defense, and mobility by the Federal Highway Administration.

History
CA 271 was part of U.S. Route 101 until a freeway bypass completed in 1970–1974, assuming the 101 designation. The former highway was then designated as CA 271.

Major intersections

See also

References

External links

California @ AARoads.com - State Route 271
Caltrans: Route 271 highway conditions
California Highways: SR 271

271
State Route 271
State Route 271
U.S. Route 101